Athanasios Konstantinidis (born April 29, 1970) is a Greek para-track and field athlete who competed at the 2016 Summer Paralympics in the F32 shot put and club throw. He gold medalled in the shot put with a world record distance of 10.39 metres.

See also 
 Greece at the 2016 Summer Paralympics

References 

Athanasios Konstantinidis at Paralympic.org

Greek male shot putters
1970 births
Living people
Paralympic athletes of Greece
Athletes (track and field) at the 2016 Summer Paralympics
Paralympic gold medalists for Greece
Medalists at the 2016 Summer Paralympics
Paralympic medalists in athletics (track and field)
Athletes (track and field) at the 2020 Summer Paralympics
Medalists at the 2020 Summer Paralympics
20th-century Greek people
21st-century Greek people